Giləzi or Kiljasi or Kilyazi may refer to:
Giləzi, Khizi, Azerbaijan
Giləzi, Siazan, Azerbaijan